Petr Kolář (born 20 June 1967) is a Czech singer.

He was born in České Budějovice. Since the late nineties he was a member of Martin Němec's band Precedens. From 2002 to 2005 he sang in a rock band Arakain. He released his first solo album Mackie Messer in 1999. He also collaborated with many other musicians, including Iveta Bartošová, Michael Kocáb, Michal David and Daniel Landa. He also sang in many musicals.

Discography
 Mackie Messer (1999)
 Album (2005)
 V Lucerně (2006)
 Bez křídel (2007)
 Akusticky v Karlíně (2009)
 Čas nás naučí (2011)
 Na Žofíně (2014)

References

External links

21st-century Czech male singers
Czech pop singers
Musicians from České Budějovice
1967 births
Living people
Recipients of the Thalia Award